Bandar Utama bus hub is a bus interchange located at Petaling Jaya, Selangor, Malaysia. It is located next to the New Wing of 1 Utama Shopping Centre at the Central Park Avenue. This bus hub is served primarily by Rapid Bus and PJ City Bus.

Rapid KL Bus
Bandar Utama is the rapidKL bus hub for their bus route services.
 : Bandar Utama - Putrajaya Sentral
 : Bandar Utama - Metro Prima via Bandar Sri Damansara
 : Kelana Jaya LRT - Kota Damansara via Bandar Utama (Section 6 Kota Damansara bound only)
 : Bandar Utama - Taman Bahagia LRT station via Damansara Jaya (operated by PJ City Bus)
 : Bandar Utama - Damansara Damai via Bandar Sri Damansara (operated by PJ City Bus)

Routes T811 and T812 connecting to Bandar Utama MRT station do not stop here.

Other services
 Aeroline Express Bus - an executive bus service to Singapore operates from here serving travellers directly to Singapore and Penang.
 First Coach Express Bus - an executive coach service operates routes to several destinations in Singapore too albeit its office and departure hall is from One World Hotel.

References

External links
 List of bus routes in Kuala Lumpur
 Klang Valley Bus Network Revamp

Bus stations in Malaysia